Sang-e Kalidar (also Romanized as Sang-e Kalīdar; also known as Dehneh Ārbāb) is a village in Robat Rural District, in the Central District of Sabzevar County, Razavi Khorasan Province, Iran. At the 2006 census, its population was 479, in 140 families.

References 

Populated places in Sabzevar County